Ann Graham Zauber is an epidemiologist and biostatistician at the Memorial Sloan Kettering Cancer Center, primarily interested in colorectal cancer. Her research has demonstrated the effectiveness of colonoscopy and polyp removal at reducing the incidence of this kind of cancer.

Zauber did her Ph.D. in biostatistics at Johns Hopkins University. She became a Fellow of the American Statistical Association in 2016.

In 2018 the World Endoscopy Organization gave her their Charles G. Moertel Distinguished Scientific Achievement Award.

References

Year of birth missing (living people)
Living people
American women epidemiologists
American epidemiologists
American statisticians
Women statisticians
Johns Hopkins University alumni
Fellows of the American Statistical Association
Biostatisticians
21st-century American women